Children's Medical Research Institute (CMRI) is an Australian medical research institute located in Westmead that conducts research into children's genetic diseases. , current research is focused on cancer, birth defects, neurological conditions such as epilepsy, and gene therapy.

Much of CMRI's cancer research focuses on telomeres (including telomerase) and the Alternative Lengthening of Telomeres (ALT) mechanism, which was discovered at CMRI in 1997.

See also 

Health in Australia

References

External links
CMRI's official website
Jeans for Genes Australia website
Australian Cancer Research Foundation website

Medical research institutes in Sydney
Sydney Medical School
1958 establishments in Australia
Research institutes established in 1958